Gajuwaka is a major residential area of Visakhapatnam City, India. This neighborhood of Visakhapatnam is considered the biggest shopping district in Andhra Pradesh by revenue. Though conceived as a residential locality, it is now one of the principal shopping districts of the city. The Gajuwaka area of Visakhapatnam has the highest per capita income in Andhra Pradesh.

Gajuwaka mandal(constituency) is one of the 46 mandals of Visakhapatnam District. It is under the administration of Visakhapatnam revenue division and the headquarters is located at Chinagantyada, Gajuwaka. The Mandal is bounded by Pedagantyada, Mulagada and Gopalapatnam mandals. On 21 November 2005, the Gajuwaka Municipality  was merged into the Greater Visakhapatnam Municipal Corporation.

Economy

Since most of the heavy industries established in Visakhapatnam, like Hindustan Petroleum Corporation Limited, Visakhapatnam Steel Plant and Gangavaram Port lie in close proximity of Gajuwaka, its growth has mirrored that of Visakhapatnam.

Gajuwaka is one of the busiest shopping districts of Andhra Pradesh. The neighborhood is considered to be the biggest shopping district in Andhra Pradesh by revenue. There are a number of apparel, jewelry, and utensil stores based in Gajuwaka. Several hotels and restaurants including Best Western Ramachandra, Paradise Food Court, and many other food court chains have emerged within 5–10 years of span.

Etymology 

The name Gajuwaka is derived from the words "Gaja" (Elephant) and "Vaagu" (Pond).

Location and geography

Gajuwaka is located about 8 km from Visakhapatnam Airport and about 12–13 km from Visakhapatnam railway station. It lies in the south west of Visakhapatnam City and is loosely bordered by Pedagantyada to the south and Anakapalle to the east, Sabbavaram to the northwest, Gopalapatnam to the north, Mulagada to the east.

Demographics 
 India census, Gajuwaka had a population of 259,944. Males constitute 52% of the population and females 48%. Gajuwaka has an average literacy rate of 70%, higher than the national average of 59.5%: male literacy is 77%, and female literacy is 63%. In Gajuwaka, 12% of the population is under 6 years of age.

Transport

Gajuwaka is well connected by road. NH16 or AH45 passes through the Mandal. It also has major District roads and State Highways connecting it to nearby Mandals and Visakhapatnam. APSRTC runs bus services from the Gajuwaka bus station to major parts of the state and Visakhapatnam.

APSRTC routes

Visakhapatnam Metro

References

External links 
 

Neighbourhoods in Visakhapatnam